Zachary Ross Trotman (born August 26, 1990) is an American former professional ice hockey defenseman. He played in the National Hockey League (NHL) with the Boston Bruins and Pittsburgh Penguins. Trotman was selected by the Bruins in the seventh round (210th overall) of the 2010 NHL Entry Draft. He was born in Carmel, Indiana but raised in Novi, Michigan.

Playing career
While playing for the Wichita Falls Wildcats of the North American Hockey League (NAHL), Trotman committed to Lake Superior State University.

After graduating from Novi High School, Trotman played three seasons (2009–2012) of NCAA Division I college ice hockey with the Lake Superior State Lakers men's ice hockey team. Trotman was drafted by the Boston Bruins in the 2010 NHL Entry Draft after his freshman year at Lake Superior State. Forgoing his final year of NCAA eligibility, on March 25, 2012, Trotman signed a three-year, entry-level contract with the Boston Bruins.

On December 28, 2013, with a season-ending injury to defenseman Dennis Seidenberg, Trotman was called up to the Boston Bruins from the Providence Bruins and made his NHL debut against the Ottawa Senators. Trotman scored his first NHL career goal on April 2, 2015, as the winning goal in a 3-2 regulation time Boston road win over the Detroit Red Wings.

On July 1, 2016, Trotman signed as a free agent to a one-year, one-way contract with the Los Angeles Kings. He was assigned to the Kings AHL affiliate, the Ontario Reign, and was limited to just 9 games before missing the remainder of the 2016–17 season, due to an upper body injury.

On July 1, 2017, Trotman left the Kings as a free agent and signed a one-year, two-way deal worth $650,000 with the defending Stanley Cup champions, the Pittsburgh Penguins. He spent the majority of the season with their American Hockey League affiliate, the Wilkes-Barre/Scranton Penguins, recording 17 points in 49 games. Following the season, the Penguins re-signed Trotman to another one-year, two-way contract. After attending training camp, Trotman was re-assigned to the Wilkes-Barre/Scranton Penguins to begin the 2018–19 season. Once again, Trotman spent the majority of the season in the AHL, only playing 13 games in the NHL during the regular season. Prior to his re-call to Pittsburgh in February, Trotman played 24 games in the AHL and recorded five points. On June 26, 2019, the Penguins re-signed him to a two-year contract worth an average annual value of $700,000 at the NHL level.

Following the 2020–21 season, his 10th professional season, Trotman as an impending free agent announced his retirement from hockey due to the physical toll on his health on June 19, 2021. He finished his career having played in 93 NHL games, collecting three goals and 13 points.

Personal life
Trotman married his fiance Jeanna in July 2017. Jeanna was also an athlete at Lake Superior State, competing in volleyball. They had their first child together, a son, in December 2020.

Career statistics

References

External links
 

1990 births
Living people
American men's ice hockey defensemen
Boston Bruins draft picks
Boston Bruins players
Ice hockey players from Indiana
Ice hockey players from Michigan
Lake Superior State Lakers men's ice hockey players
Ontario Reign (AHL) players
People from Carmel, Indiana
People from Novi, Michigan
Pittsburgh Penguins players
Providence Bruins players
Wichita Falls Wildcats players
Wilkes-Barre/Scranton Penguins players